"Tell Laura I Love Her" is a teenage tragedy song written by Jeff Barry and Ben Raleigh. It was a US top ten popular music hit for singer Ray Peterson in 1960 on RCA Victor Records, reaching No. 7 on the Billboard Hot 100 chart. Later that same year, it was recorded and released by Ricky Valance in the United Kingdom, where it went to the No. 1 spot on the UK Singles Chart. The song has been a hit in 14 countries, and has sold over seven million copies.

Content
The song tells the tragic story from a witness' perspective of a young man named Tommy who is in love with Laura and wants to marry her, so he enters a stock car race, despite being the youngest and most inexperienced driver, hoping to win and use the prize money to buy Laura a wedding ring. The second verse tells how his car overturns and bursts into flames. Tommy is fatally injured and his last words are "Tell Laura I love her... My love for her will never die".  In the final verse, Laura prays inside the chapel, where a church organ is heard, and where she can still hear Tommy's voice intoning the title one more time, before it fades out.

Recording history
The lyrics of "Tell Laura I Love Her" originally concerned a rodeo, not an automobile race, as composer Jeff Barry was an aficionado of cowboy culture. However, at RCA's instigation, Barry rewrote the song, in order to more closely resemble the No. 1 hit "Teen Angel". The personnel on the original recording included Al Chernet, Charles Macy, and Sebastian Mure on guitars: Lloyd Trotman on bass; Andrew Ackers on organ; Bob Burns on sax; and Bunny Shawker on drums.

Decca Records in England decided not to release Ray Peterson's 1960 recording on the grounds that it was "too tasteless and vulgar" and destroyed about twenty-five thousand copies that had already been pressed. A cover by Ricky Valance, released by EMI on the Columbia label, was No. 1 on the UK Singles Chart for three weeks. Valance's version was initially banned by the BBC; it was considered to be in "bad taste" and expressed concern for copycat activity.

The Peterson single was re-released in 1962, following the success of Valance's recording.

Chart history

Weekly charts

Ricky Valance

Johnny T. Angel

Year-end charts

Other versions
In the U.S. a recording by Johnny T. Angel (a.k.a. Bill Gilliland) on Bell Records peaked at No. 94 on June 22, 1974.

In 1973, Dutch singer Albert West released his 7" version which reached No. 8 on the Dutch Top 40.

In 1973, New Zealand band Creation released a rendering which peaked at No. 3 on the New Zealand charts and at No. 20 in the Australian charts the following year.

The story of the song was adapted for stage and turned into Tell Laura I Love Her (The Musical) in 2007 by Richard C. Hague.

Spanish versions were recorded ("Dile a Laura que la quiero") by Chilean singer Ray Palaviccino in 1962, by Mexican singer César Costa ("Dile que la quiero" / "La historia de Tommy"), and Spanish group Los HH in 1963.

There were also versions in Serbian ("Lora, ja te volim", by Miodrag Jevremović), Danish ("Hils Lillian kærligt", by Heaven and "Si' til Lis hun er min tøs", by Dick Kaysø and Peter Thorup), Dutch ("Ik blijf van Laura houden", by Charles Tuinenburg and The Melody Strings), Finnish ("Laura (sua kauheesti kaipaan)" by Hector), French ("Dis à Laura", by Richard Anthony), German ("Das Ende der Liebe", by Rex Gildo), Italian ("Dite a Laura che l'amo", by Michele), Swedish ("Jag Älskar Min Laura", by Carli Tornehave), Mandarin ("告訴羅娜我愛她") and Vietnamese ("Trưng Vương Khung Cửa Mùa Thu", by Nam Lộc).

Answer song versions
An answer song, "Tell Tommy I Miss Him" was released by Marilyn Michaels in 1960. It was originally released by RCA Victor Records as a single and is included on the 2007 compilation album The Answer to Everything - Girl Answer Songs of the '60's. In 1961, country singer Skeeter Davis released the same song on her album Here's the Answer. British singer Laura Lee with orchestra directed by Johnny Keating also recorded a version, released by Triumph Records as a single in the UK in August 1960.

References

1960 singles
1960 songs
1960s ballads
Pop ballads
Songs with lyrics by Ben Raleigh
Songs written by Jeff Barry
Teenage tragedy songs
Songs about cars
UK Singles Chart number-one singles
Vehicle wreck ballads
Columbia Graphophone Company singles
RCA Victor singles
EMI Records singles